Kəlbəhüseynli (also, Kelbaguseynli, Kel’baguseynli, and Kyal’bi-Guseynly) is a village and municipality in the Masally Rayon of Azerbaijan. It has a population of 1,231.

References 

Populated places in Masally District